Divorce Not Allowed is a 2018 Nigerian romantic comedy produced and directed by Mike Ezuruonye. The movie, which addresses relationship issues between couples and lovers, stars Bolanle Ninalowo, Iyabo Ojo, Angela Okorie, Eniola Badmus and Mike Ezuruonye.

Synopsis 
The film revolves around the problems faced by young couples and how their solutions sometimes lead to separation. The movie narrates the scenes through three young married men that experience problems in their marriages that make them wish they have never married. They are not bold enough to separate, but rather deploy other means that can librate them from the bondages.

Premiere 
The movie was first premiered in Nigeria and was later premiered in Boleyn Cinemas, Barking Road, London, UK on June 23, 2018.

Cast 
Mike Ezuruonye, Rotimi Salami, Kehinde Olorunyomi, Eniola Badmus, Iyabo Ojo, Angela Okorie, Bolanle Ninalowo, Efe Irele, Tolade Anibaba, and Bestman Thompson.

References 

2018 films
Nigerian romantic comedy films
English-language Nigerian films